Norway chose their entry for the Eurovision Song Contest 2007 during Melodi Grand Prix 2007. Actress turned singer, Guri Schanke, won the right to represent Norway with the song "Ven a bailar conmigo". The song has been described as a sexy Latin dance number.

Before Eurovision

Melodi Grand Prix 2007 

Melodi Grand Prix 2007 was the Norwegian national final that selected Norway's entry for the Eurovision Song Contest 2007. Three semi-finals, one Last Chance round and a final were held between 20 January and 10 February 2007.

Semi-finals and Last Chance round 

 The first semi-final took place on 20 January 2007 at the Finnmarkshallen in Alta. "Love on the Dancefloor" performed by Torhild Sivertsen and the Funky Family and "Hooked on You" performed by Infinity qualified directly to the final, while "Goodbye to Yesterday" performed by Blue Moon Band and "Are You Ready?" performed by Stian Joneid advanced to the Second Chance round. "Perfect Sin" performed by Marika Lejon and "Livets små stjerner" performed by Marianne Solberg were eliminated from the contest.
 The second semi-final took place on 27 January 2007 at the Bodø Spektrum in Bodø. "Ven a bailar conmigo" performed by Guri Schanke and "Chicken Rodeo" performed by Dusty Cowshit qualified directly to the final, while "Better Than This" performed by Hazen and "Under stjernene" performed by Malin Schavenius advanced to the Second Chance round. "I Wanna Be with You" performed by Andreea and "Unbelievable" performed by Amelia were eliminated from the contest.
 The third semi-final took place on 3 February 2007 at the Brunstad Conference Center in Stokke. "Wannabe" performed by Crash! and "Vil du ha svar?" performed by Jenny Jensen qualified directly to the final, while "Rocket Ride" performed by Jannicke Abrahamsen and "Maybe" performed by Trine Rein feat. Andreas Ljones advanced to the Second Chance round. "Creator" performed by Monica Hjelle and "Here" performed by Christina Undhjem were eliminated from the contest.
 The Last Chance round (Siste sjanse) took place on 8 February 2007 at the Spektrum in Oslo. "Maybe" performed by Trine Rein feat. Andreas Ljones and "Rocket Ride" performed by Jannicke Abrahamsen qualified to the final.

Final 
Eight songs competed during the final on 10 February 2007 held at the Spektrum in Oslo. The winner was selected over two rounds of voting. In the first round, the top four entries were selected by public televoting to proceed to the second round, the Gold Final: "Chicken Rodeo" performed by Dusty Cowshit, "Rocket Ride" performed by Jannicke Abrahamsen, "Wannabe" performed by Crash! and "Ven a bailar conmigo" performed by Guri Schanke. In the Gold Final, three juries from the hosts of the three semi-final cities gave each Gold Finalist 2,000, 4,000, 6,000 and 10,000 points. The results of the public televote were then revealed by Norway's five regions, which were added to the jury scores. This led to the victory of "Ven a bailar conmigo" performed by Guri Schanke with 108,541 votes.

At Eurovision
Because Norway placed 14th at the 2006 contest Norway participated in the semi-final on 10 May 2007 in Helsinki, Finland performing nineteenth in the competition, following Macedonia's Karolina Gočeva with "Mojot svet" and preceding Malta's Olivia Lewis with "Vertigo". The song finished eighteenth in the competition, thus missing out on a top-ten position which would have secured a place in the finals.

Voting

Points awarded to Norway

Points awarded by Norway

References

External links
Full national final on nrk.no

2007
Countries in the Eurovision Song Contest 2007
Eurovision
Eurovision